The Connacht Senior Club Football Championship is an annual Gaelic football tournament played between senior clubs in Connacht, with one qualifying from each of the five individual county championships. The winners of the Connacht football championship qualify for the All-Ireland Senior Club Football Championship.

History
The Connacht Senior Club Football Championship is an annual Gaelic football tournament played on a knockout basis between the senior club championship winners of the competing counties in Connacht, with the addition of the London champions since 2018. Prior to this, the London champions entered the all-Ireland series at the quarter final stage. The current holders of the title are Padraig Pearses of Roscommon. While a provincial competition existed prior to 1970, Galway side Fr. Griffins were the first winners of the competition in its current format, in the 1970–71 season. The most successful club is Corofin of Galway, who have won the competition on nine occasions, while Roscommon's Clann na nGael hold the record for consecutive titles, with their six-in-a-row from 1984 to 1989. Galway clubs have the most wins, with 19 titles.

The trophy is the Shane McGettigan Cup, named after an Allen Gaels and Leitrim player, who died in a construction accident in Quincy, Massachusetts, in 1998, aged just 21. He was the son of singer Charlie McGettigan.

Wins listed by club

Wins listed by county

No club from Leitrim has ever won the Connacht Club Football Championship.

Finals listed by year

References

External sources

1